GKU may refer to:

 Guru Kashi University, in Punjab, India
 ǂUngkue language